Bidak-e Sohrab (also Romanized as Bīdak-e Sohrāb; also known as Bīdak-e Soflá) is a village in Poshteh-ye Zilayi Rural District, Sarfaryab District, Charam County, Kohgiluyeh and Boyer-Ahmad Province, Iran. At the 2006 census, its population was 85, in 17 families.

References 

Populated places in Charam County